Warwick Cairns (born 1962) is a British author. His three books include: How to Live Dangerously, About the Size of It, and In Praise of Savagery.

Early life and education 
Cairns was born in  Dagenham,  Essex, England. He was educated in English and psychology at Keele University in England and English at Yale University in the United States, where he studied under Professor Harold Bloom.

His first book, About the Size of It (Pan Macmillan, 2007) championed the cause of traditional systems of measurement. His second, How to Live Dangerously (Pan Macmillan, 2008 and St. Martin's Press, 2009) criticised the excessive concern with 'Health & Safety' throughout much of the industrialised world and argued that it is necessary to embrace risk to live life to the full. The most frequently-quoted statistic in How to Live Dangerously is described thus by Steven Pinker: "The writer Warwick Cairns calculated that if you wanted your child to be kidnapped and held overnight by a stranger, you'd have to leave the child outside and unattended for 750,000 years unless you live in Detroit." His third book, In  Praise of Savagery, tells the story of a 1930s expedition by the British explorer Wilfred Thesiger, and a journey to meet him in a mud hut in Africa towards the end of his life.

References

External links

Pan Macmillan web page on Warwick Cairns

British non-fiction writers
People from Dagenham
1962 births
Living people
British male writers
Male non-fiction writers